The New South Wales Rugby League administered several competitions during the 2021 rugby league season in Australia. The season was impacted by the Delta variant of the COVID-19 pandemic. Junior competitions, Country representative tournaments, and City versus Country representative matches were concluded prior to the impact of lockdown in June 2021. The lockdowns, however, led to the postponement and subsequent cancellation of senior competitions.

Knock on Effect New South Wales Cup 

The 2021 season of the Knock on Effect New South Wales Cup was curtailed due to lockdowns introduced to combat the Delta variant of the COVID-19 pandemic in New South Wales. Fifteen of a scheduled 24 rounds were played, with the last completed round of matches occurring on the weekend of 19–20 June 2021.

Teams 
There will be 11 teams in 2021.

Ladder 
The table below reflects the competition ladder at the completion of Round 15. This was the last completed round played, and occurred on the weekend of the 19–20 June 2021. During July and early August 2021, when there was a hope that the competition could be resumed in late August and September, scheduled matches were cancelled, with the result recorded as a nil-all draw. A Round 2 match between Blacktown Workers Sea Eagles and South Sydney Rabbitohs was postponed due to wet weather. As the rescheduled date was 28 July 2021 this match was not played.

Finals series 
Due to the cancellation of the competition, a final Series was not held for the 2021 Knock on Effect New South Wales Cup.

President's Cup

Northern Conference (Denton Engineering Cup)

Ladder 
The competition was affected by the expanding impact of the COVID-19 pandemic in New South Wales. From Round 13, lockdown restrictions applying to the Central Coast prevented the scheduled matches of The Entrance Tigers, Wyong Roos, and for several rounds Lakes United Seagulls, from taking place. After Round 17, lockdown restrictions were extended to Newcastle and the Hunter and the final round, Round 18, was not played.

Notes:
 In the above table CD refers to Covid Draw. Each team was assigned one point, per a normal draw.
 Two Round 1 matches were postponed due grounds being affected by wet weather.
 The postponed Maitland PickersKurri Kurri Bulldogs match was played on Sunday, 27 June 2021.
 The Lakes United SeagullsWestern Suburbs Rosellas that had been postponed was assigned as a Covid Draw.

Finals series 
Due to the cancellation of the competition, a final Series was not held for the 2021 Denton Engineering Cup.

Central Conference (Ron Massey Cup)

Ladder 
The table below reflects the matches played prior to the cessation of the competition. 

Notes:
 The competition was suspended in early July and subsequently cancelled.
 Round 2 was postponed following to the closure of venues due to wet weather. Two of the five matches were played prior to the lockdown.
  Kaiviti Silktails defeated  Blacktown Workers Sea Eagles on Thursday, 24 June 2021.
  Windsor Wolves defeated  Mounties on Saturday, 26 June 2021.
  Hills District Bulls had the bye in Round 2.
 Round 10 marked the City-Country representative weekend. No Ron Massey Cup teams played.
 Rounds 16 (3-4 July) to 21 (7-8 Aug) were cancelled. The scheduled matches in these Rounds were designated as a nil-all Cover Draw whilst there was a hope that the competition could be resumed. 
 Rounds 22 and 23 were abandoned.

Finals series 
Due to the cancellation of the competition, a final Series was not held for the 2021 Ron Massey Cup.

Southern Conference (Mojo Homes Illawarra Cup)

Ladder 
The ladder below reflects the 9 out of scheduled 15 rounds that were completed prior to the suspension and subsequent cancellation of the competition.
The table below reflects the matches played prior to the cessation of the competition. 

Notes
 Originally scheduled for 8 May 2021, Round 5 was washed out and postponed until 24 July 2021, however, due to the lockdown the round was not played.

Finals series 
Due to the cancellation of the competition, a final Series was not held for the 2021 Mojo Homes Illawarra Cup.

President's Cup 
Due to the cancellation of NSWRL major competitions in August, the planned four-team knock-out series for the 2021 President's Cup was not held. The plan was to include the three major premiers from the Northern (Newcastle, Hunter and Central Coast), Central (Ron Massey Cup) and Southern (Illawarra) Conferences, along with a wild card entry.

Major NSWRL Competitions

Jersey Flegg Cup

Ladder 
The table below reflects the matches played prior to the cessation of the competition. 

Notes:
 The competition was suspended in early July and subsequently cancelled.
 Four of five Round 2 matches originally scheduled for 20 & 21 March 2021 were postponed following to the closure of venues due to wet weather.
 Cronulla-Sutherland Sharks beat Victoria Thunderbolts on Sunday, 21 March 2021.
 Penrith Panthers beat Canterbury-Bankstown Bulldogs on Saturday, 27 March 2021.
 Wests Tigers drew with Sydney Roosters on Friday, 14 May 2021.
 St George Illawarra Dragons beat Parramatta Eels on Saturday, 15 May 2021.
 Manly-Warringah Sea Eagles beat South Sydney Rabbitohs on Saturday, 12 June 2021. 
 Round 10 (15 & 16 May) marked the City-Country representative weekend. Only the two postponed Jersey Flegg matches were played.
 Rounds 16 (3-4 July) to 21 (7-8 Aug) were cancelled. The scheduled matches in these Rounds were designated as a nil-all Cover Draw whilst there was a hope that the competition could be resumed. 
 Rounds 22, 23 and 24 were abandoned.

Finals series 
Due to the cancellation of the competition, a final Series was not held for the 2021 Jersey Flegg Cup.

Harvey Norman NSW Women's Premiership

Ladder

Finals series 
The competition was suspended during the week that preceded the planned first week of a three-week, six team final series. Subsequently, in August, the 2021 Harvey Norman NSW Women's Premiership competition was cancelled.

Sydney Shield

Ladder 
The table below reflects the matches played prior to the cessation of the competition. 

Notes:
 The competition was suspended in early July and subsequently cancelled.
 Round 2 was postponed following to the closure of venues due to wet weather. Two of the five matches were played prior to the lockdown.
  Brothers Penrith defeated  Belrose Eagles on Sunday, 16 May 2021.
  Cronulla Caringbah Sharks defeated  Cabramatta Two Blues on Saturday, 26 June 2021.
  Hills District Bulls had the bye in Round 2.
 Round 10 marked the City-Country representative weekend. No Sydney Shield teams played.
 Rounds 16 (3-4 July) to 21 (7-8 Aug) were cancelled. The scheduled matches in these Rounds were designated as a nil-all Cover Draw whilst there was a hope that the competition could be resumed. 
 Rounds 22 and 23 were abandoned.

Finals series 
Due to the cancellation of the competition a final Series was not held for the 2021 Sydney Shield.

NSW Men's Country Championships 
The 2021 Men's Country Championship was won by Monaro Colts.

Northern Conference Ladder

Southern Conference Ladder

Finals series

NSW Women's Country Championships

Northern Conference Ladder

Southern Conference Ladder

Finals series

NSWRL Junior Reps

SG Ball Cup 
The 2021 S.G. Ball Cup competition was won by the Canberra Raiders. The Raiders' lock forward, Trey Mooney, was named Player of the Match. Illawarra's five-eighth, Junior Amone, was named Player of the Series.

Ladder

Finals series

Harold Matthews Cup 
The 2021 Harold Matthews competition was won by Manly-Warringah. The Sea Eagles' five-eighth, Latu Fainu, was named both Player of the Match and Player of the Series.

Ladder

Finals series

Tarsha Gale Cup 
The 2021 Tarsha Gale Cup competition was won by St George. The Dragons' half-back, Rayven-Jodeci Boyce, was named Player of the Match. The Dragons' prop forward, Fatafehi Hanisi, was named Player of the Series.

Ladder

Finals series

Laurie Daley Cup 
The 2021 Laurie Daley Cup was won by the Central Coast Roosters. The Roosters' hooker, Tyler Moriarty, was named Player of the Match.

Northern Conference Ladder

Southern Conference Ladder

Finals series

Andrew Johns Cup 
The 2021 Andrew Johns Cup competition was won by Central Coast Roosters' captain, James Miller, was named Player of the Match.

Northern Conference Ladder

Southern Conference Ladder

Finals series

City versus Country 
The New South Wales Rugby League conducted a representative programme on the weekend of 15–16 May 2021. This included City versus Country matches in five categories: Wheelchair, Under 16s, Under 18s, Women's (Origin, Open Age), Physical Disability and Men's (Representative, Open Age). In addition, the programme included two matches between Newcastle and Illawarra representative teams - in Under 20s and Open Age categories.

Women's Origin 
The City-Country Origin Women's match was played on Saturday, 15 May 2021 at Bankwest Stadium.
The following players were selected in the City Origin Women's team. The team was coached by Lisa Fiaola ( North Sydney Bears).

The following players were selected in the Country Origin Women's team. The team was coached by Adam Bezzina.

Match Details

Men's Open Age 
The following players were selected, from Ron Massey Cup clubs, into the City Men's Open Age team. The team was coached by Brett Cook.

The following players were selected in the Country Origin Men's team. The team was coached by Beau Scott.

Match Details

Women's State of Origin 

On 25 May 2021, the NSWRL announced a 19-player squad for their fixture against Queensland on 25 June 2021 at Sunshine Coast Stadium.  The table below includes appearances and points scored in the 2021 match. 

Notes:
 Brydie Parker and Renee Targett did not play in the match.
 Players to subsequently change NRLW clubs in the delayed 2021 season (played February to April 2022) were:
  Parramatta Eels: Kennedy Cherrington, Filomina Hanisi, Tiana Penitani, Maddie Studdon, Simaima Taufa, and Botille Vette-Welsh. 
  St George Illawarra Dragons: Keeley Davis and Renee Targett (making her NRLW debut).
  Sydney Roosters: Isabelle Kelly, Jessica Sergis.

References

2021 in Australian rugby league
Rugby league in New South Wales
Rugby league competitions in New South Wales